Anti-Chinese legislation in the United States was introduced in the United States to deal with Chinese migrants following the gold rush in California and those coming to build the railway, including:

Anti-Coolie Act of 1862
Page Act of 1875
Chinese Exclusion Act of 1882
Pigtail Ordinance

See also
 Burlingame Treaty
 Chinese Exclusion Act – (United States)
 China exclusion policy of NASA, 2011 – (United States)
 Chinese Immigration Act of 1885 – (Canada)
 Chinese Immigration Act, 1923 – (Canada)
 Definitions of whiteness in the United States
 Eugenics in the United States
 Geary Act
 Immigration and Nationality Services Act of 1965
 Magnuson Act

References

External links
 Chinese Exclusion Act
 George Frederick Seward and the Chinese Exclusion Act | "From the Stacks" at New-York Historical Society

Anti-Chinese legislation
Anti-Chinese sentiment in the United States
United States federal immigration and nationality legislation
Human migration